John D. Burckitt (16 December 1946 – 1999) was an English professional footballer who played as a left back.

Career
Born in Coventry, Burckitt played for Coventry, Bradford City and Walsall.

Burckitt made his debut for Coventry in October 1964, and made seven appearances for the club, five in the Second Division and two in the League Cup. While with Coventry, he played for the England youth team that reached the final of the 1965 European Youth Championships.

His final appearance for Coventry was in September 1966 in a League Cup tie against Derby County. He joined Bradford City on loan from Coventry City, and was with the club from March to July 1967. He made nine appearances in the Football League for the club.

Burckitt left Coventry in the 1968 close season for Walsall, but never appeared for their first team, and went on to play non-league football for Rugby Town and Nuneaton Borough.

He died in late 1999 at the age of 52.

Sources

References

1946 births
1999 deaths
Footballers from Coventry
English footballers
England youth international footballers
Association football fullbacks
Coventry City F.C. players
Bradford City A.F.C. players
Walsall F.C. players
Rugby Town F.C. (1945) players
Nuneaton Borough F.C. players
English Football League players